David Sykes may refer to:

 David Sykes (footballer) (born 1942), Australian rules footballer
 David Sykes (rugby league), rugby league footballer of the 1980s
 David Sykes (programmer), co-founder of Revolution Software
 David John Sykes (1865–1941), farmer and political figure in Saskatchewan